George Forbes may refer to:

Australia 
George Forbes (philanthropist) (1915–2006), Australian charity director and women's advocate
George Forbes (Queensland politician) (1828–1881), Member of the Queensland Legislative Assembly, Australia
George Forbes (New South Wales politician), member of the New South Wales Legislative Council

Ireland 
George Forbes (footballer, born 1868) (1868–?), Irish footballer
George Forbes, 3rd Earl of Granard (1685–1765), Anglo-Irish naval commander and diplomatist
George Forbes, 4th Earl of Granard (1710–1769), MP for St Johnstown (County Longford) and Mullingar
George Forbes, 5th Earl of Granard (1740–1780), MP for St Johnstown (County Longford)
George Forbes, 6th Earl of Granard (1760–1837), Irish peer
George Forbes, 7th Earl of Granard (1833–1889), Irish peer and soldier
George Forbes, Viscount Forbes (1785–1836), MP for Longford

United Kingdom 
George Forbes (businessman) (1944–2022), Scottish farmer and property developer, chairman of Newcastle United F.C.
George Forbes (scientist) (1849–1936), Scottish electrical engineer, astronomer, and inventor
George Forbes (footballer, born 1914) (1914–1964), centre half for Blackburn Rovers and Barrow
George Forbes, 3rd Earl of Granard (1685–1765), Anglo-Irish naval commander and diplomatist
George Hay Forbes (1821–1875), Scottish Episcopalian clergyman
George Forbes (cashier), Chief Cashier of the Bank of England from 1866 to 1873
George Forbes (cricketer) (1906–1984), Scottish cricketer

Others 
George Forbes (Canadian politician) (1840–1925), merchant and political figure in Prince Edward Island
George W. Forbes (1864–1927), American journalist
George Forbes (New Zealand politician) (1869–1947), Prime Minister of New Zealand
George L. Forbes (born 1931), American politician from Cleveland, Ohio